Sergei Tiviakov (born 14 February 1973) is a Russian–Dutch chess grandmaster. He is a three-time Dutch Champion and was European Champion in 2008.

Chess career
Tiviakov won the World Under-18 Championship in 1990 in Singapore. He was awarded the Grandmaster title in 1991.

Tiviakov won the Dutch Chess Championship in 2006, 2007 and 2018. In 2008, in Plovdiv, Bulgaria he won the European Individual Chess Championship.

Tiviakov won the Politiken Cup in Helsingør, Denmark in July 2008 on tiebreak after scoring 8/10. In 2009 he won the 13th Unive Tournament in Hoogeveen. In 2011 he came first in the Fagernes Chess Festival, in the  5th Leiden Chess Tournament and in the First Panama Chess Open. In 2015 Tiviakov won the 24th Paul Keres Memorial Rapid Tournament in Tallinn.

His first Olympiad appearance was for Russia at the Moscow event in 1994, when he took home a gold medal in celebration of the team's winning performance. He played for the Dutch team at each of the events held from 2000–2006, with an overall record of +14 −2 =33 (62.2%).

At the European Team Chess Championships, he has earned three gold medals (two team and one individual) for his contribution to the successful Dutch teams of 2001 (León) and 2005 (Gothenburg). At León, he registered a 77.8% score.

Tiviakov and Bogdan Lalic both claim to have played a previous record 110 consecutive tournament games at classical time controls without losing, although neither player faced exclusively elite-level opponents during their unbeaten streaks. Tiviakov's streak occurred between 28 October 2004 and 27 September 2005. 
The current record belongs to Magnus Carlsen (+39, =81), who remains unbeaten through 120 games since 31 July 2018. 
While still holding the record, Tiviakov said Ding Liren's 100 consecutive games without a loss against elite-level opponents in 2017–2018 was a comparison of apples and oranges.

References

External links

Sergei Tiviakov chess games at 365Chess.com

1973 births
Living people
Chess grandmasters
Chess Olympiad competitors
Dutch chess players
Russian emigrants to the Netherlands
World Youth Chess Champions
European Chess Champions
Russian chess players
People from Krasnodar